New Hampshire Route 110 (abbreviated NH 110) is a  east–west state highway in Coos County, northern New Hampshire, United States. The road winds through the scenic, mountainous country of New Hampshire north of the White Mountain National Forest. NH 110 is locally named the Berlin-Groveton Highway.

The eastern terminus of NH 110 is in Berlin at New Hampshire Route 16 (White Mountain Road). The western terminus of NH 110 is at U.S. Route 3 in the village of Groveton, town of Northumberland, on the Connecticut River.

Major intersections

Suffixed routes

New Hampshire Route 110A

New Hampshire Route 110A (abbreviated NH 110A) is a  connector road in the town of Milan, north of Berlin, United States. NH 110A is locally named Cedar Pond Road.

The eastern terminus of NH 110A is at New Hampshire Route 16 (White Mountain Road) 12 miles (19.3 km) north of Berlin. The western terminus is at New Hampshire Route 110 11.2 miles (18 km) northwest of Berlin.

New Hampshire Route 110B

New Hampshire Route 110B (abbreviated NH 110B) is a  connector road in the town of Milan, New Hampshire, north of Berlin. NH 110B is locally named Milan Hill Road.

The eastern terminus of NH 110B is at New Hampshire Route 16 near the Berlin Regional Airport. The western terminus is at New Hampshire Route 110A near Cedar Pond.

References

External links

 New Hampshire State Route 110 on Flickr
 New Hampshire State Route 110A on Flickr

110
Transportation in Coös County, New Hampshire